Gustavo Turraca (born 15 July 1995) is an Argentine professional footballer who plays as a midfielder for Independiente Rivadavia on loan from Los Andes.

Career
Turraca started out with Los Andes. He was with their first-team for two seasons in Primera B Metropolitana from 2013–14 but didn't make an appearance, with the last of which ending with promotion to Primera B Nacional. Turraca subsequently appeared three times on the substitutes bench in the 2015 campaign without coming on, though did make his senior bow across that year against Fénix in the Copa Argentina on 8 February. He subsequently made sixty-seven appearances in league football across the following three seasons. Turraca scored his first senior goal in October 2018 versus Olimpo.

In July 2019, following Los Andes' relegation to the third tier, Turraca was loaned out to Primera B Nacional club Almagro. He appeared six times for them, before returning to his parent club in June 2020 and signing a new short-term contract.

Career statistics
.

References

External links

1995 births
Living people
Sportspeople from Buenos Aires Province
Argentine footballers
Association football midfielders
Primera Nacional players
Club Atlético Los Andes footballers
Club Almagro players
Independiente Rivadavia footballers